Bogafjell Church is a parish church of the Church of Norway in the western part of the large Sandnes municipality in Rogaland county, Norway. It is located in the borough of Bogafjell, just south of the centre of the city of Sandnes. It is the church for the Bogafjell parish which is part of the Sandnes prosti (deanery) in the Diocese of Stavanger. The gray, concrete church was built in a rectangular design in 2012 using designs by the architect Grete Gudmestad Krogedal from the company Rambøll Arkitektur. The  church seats about 400 people. The church was consecrated on 4 March 2012.

See also
List of churches in Rogaland

References

Sandnes
Churches in Rogaland
21st-century Church of Norway church buildings
Churches completed in 2012
2012 establishments in Norway